Kirill Lyamin (born January 13, 1986) is a Russian professional ice hockey player. He is currently under contract with HC Yugra of the Supreme Hockey League (VHL).

Playing career
Lyamin is a product of the CSKA Moscow ice hockey system. The young defenceman spent started playing for the Super League (Russia 1) club during the 2003–04 season at just the age of 16. He was a longtime member of the U18 and the U20 national teams and was drafted by the Ottawa Senators in the 2004 NHL Entry Draft with the 58th overall pick in the second round. After the draft, Lyamin spent another two seasons with CSKA before signing a new deal with HC Khimik, where he played through the 2007–08 season. In 2008, he signed with Spartak Moscow.

On 24 May 2011, Lyamin signed a two-year deal with Avangard Omsk.

After two seasons with HC Neftekhimik Nizhnekamsk, Lyamin left as a free agent to sign a two-year contract starting from the 2017–18 season with Avtomobilist Yekaterinburg, on May 8, 2017.

In his lone season under contract in 2019–20 with Dynamo Moscow, Lyamin added 2 goals and 8 points in 54 games from the blueline. With the playoffs cancelled after completion of the first-round due to the COVID-19 pandemic, Lyamin left the club as a free agent.

After a well travelled 2020-21 season, split between Spartak Moscow and a return to Dynamo Moscow, as well as a season ending stint in the Polish Hockey League, Lyamin returned to the KHL in agreeing to a contract with HC Vityaz on 4 July 2021.

Career statistics

Regular season and playoffs

International

References

External links 

 

1986 births
Living people
Atlant Moscow Oblast players
Avangard Omsk players
Avtomobilist Yekaterinburg players
HC CSKA Moscow players
HC Dynamo Moscow players
HC Neftekhimik Nizhnekamsk players
Ottawa Senators draft picks
Russian ice hockey defencemen
Severstal Cherepovets players
HC Spartak Moscow players
Ice hockey people from Moscow
HC Vityaz players
HC Yugra players